"Trouble in Paradise" is 1974 single by Loretta Lynn. "Trouble in Paradise" was Lynn's eighth number one on the U.S country singles chart as a solo artist. The single stayed at number one for a single week and spent a total of thirteen weeks on the chart.

Chart performance

References
 

1974 singles
Loretta Lynn songs
Songs written by Kenny O'Dell
Song recordings produced by Owen Bradley
Decca Records singles
1974 songs